The 1948 Boston Yanks season was their fifth in the National Football League and last as the Yanks (subsequently becoming the New York Bulldogs). The team failed to improve on their previous season's output of 4–7–1, winning only three games. They failed to qualify for the playoffs for the fifth consecutive season.  This would be Boston's final professional football team until the Patriots began play in 1960, as a charter member of the AFL.

Schedule

Standings

References

1948
Boston Yanks
Boston Yanks